Two submarines of Germany have borne the name UC-1:

, a Type UC I submarine launched in 1915 and lost in 1917
, formerly the B-class submarine HNoMS B-5 captured from Norway in 1940

See also
 German Type UC I submarine

German Navy ship names